The Epping Forest Guardian now known as Your Local Guardian as a result of rebranding  is a local newspaper sold every Thursday in the district of Epping Forest in Essex, England.

The paper is published by Newsquest, which also prints papers covering the neighbouring areas – the Waltham Forest Guardian and the Wanstead and Woodford Guardian – along with dozens of local and regional papers across the UK.

The newspaper's weekly circulation is 3,495 copies, according to ABC figures from July to December 2017.

Editors 

 Amanda Patterson (group editor) 2008 – 200? 
 Anthony Longden (group editor) 200?- 2012
 Tim Jones (group editor) 2012 – 2017
 Victoria Birch (group editor) 2017–present

References

External links
The Epping Forest Guardian's website

Newspapers published in Essex